The Malaysian National News Agency, is a news agency of the government of Malaysia. It is an autonomous body under the Ministry of Communications and Multimedia. Bernama (usually stylized in all caps) is an abbreviation of Berita Nasional Malaysia (Malaysia National News); it also means named or titled in the Malay language. It was created by an Act of Parliament in 1967 and began operating on 20 May 1968.

Overview 
BERNAMA operates from its headquarters at Wisma Bernama, off Jalan Tun Razak near National Library, Kuala Lumpur. It has its branches in every state in Malaysia. It also has correspondents in Jakarta, Singapore and Bangkok and also its stringers in Washington, D.C., New York City, Australia and London. Most of the news media in Malaysia and Singapore and international news agencies subscribe to BERNAMA.

Bernama began reporting using the audio-visual medium with the opening of its audio-visual division in September 1998. It also has its own radio and television channel. Bernama Radio is a 24-hour news and talk radio station broadcasting in the areas of Kuala Lumpur and the Klang Valley on 93.9 FM, as well as in Kuching, Kota Kinabalu, Johor Bahru and Singapore on different frequencies.  Bernama TV is a channel which offers news in Malay, English, Chinese and Tamil on Channel 502 and Channel 631 of Astro and Unifi TV, respectively.

Bernama TV 

Bernama TV (formerly known as Bernama News Channel) is a Malaysian free-to-air news television network. It is owned by Bernama, a government news agency. It airs news programmes that are related to local and international business, lifestyle, sports and entertainment. Like Radio Televisyen Malaysia's television channels, Bernama TV have some amount of commercial advertising.

BNC news bulletins were initially aired on Astro Ria, Astro Prima, Astro AEC, Astro Wah Lai Toi and Astro Vaanavil, but they have since been integrated to one Astro network. Its news content is primarily broadcast in Malay. However, there are also news bulletin in English, Mandarin, and Tamil since 2018. Other shows that are broadcast on BNC are flagship talk-shows like Malay-medium "Ruang Bicara" as well as English-medium "The Nation" and "The Brief".

On 25 May 2016, BNC went into a major rebrand, rebranding itself from Bernama TV to Bernama News Channel (BNC) only to quietly revert to its original logo and name in October 2019. The staff were offered a contract with Gem Bytes Sdn Bhd on 14th day of the same month and year. On 8 October 2021 from 12:00am onwards, Bernama TV switch to broadcasting in HD format.

Bernama Radio 

Bernama Radio (formerly known as Radio24 or BERNAMA Radio24 until March 2016) is the first all-news radio station in Malaysia. The free-to-air station began trial transmission on 2007 at noon and was officially launched on 3 September 2007 at 9:00 a.m. It broadcasts on the FM 93.9 MHz frequency in the Klang Valley that was formerly used by RTM's Klasik Nasional FM.

The station broadcasts domestic, regional and world news through hourly news bulletins, quarter-hourly news highlights and breaking news as and when they happen through live field reports and telephone cross-overs. The station also has an array of talk-back shows. It also airs at frequent intervals, traffic, weather and stock market reports. The station also provides live audio streaming through its website. On 3 January 2011, the station began its Mobile Streaming service via smartphones, accessible through the devices on board internet browser.

The station underwent a minor rebrand in March 2016 whereby the station is now known as "Bernama Radio".

Broadcasting in both English and Malay, the station is owned and operated by the news agency, and broadcasts from Wisma Bernama in Kuala Lumpur. For its first phase, the station's transmission covered the Klang Valley, which is home to approximately eight million people.

Tamil language broadcasting was introduced on 4 February 2017. The slot, known as "Tamil Oli", is broadcast from 11a.m. to 1p.m. and from 11p.m. to midnight every Saturday and Sunday respectively. It is created in collaboration with New Wave Events Sdn Bhd and will be based on an infotainment concept. The introduction of such slots also means that Tamil language radio broadcasts will be launched in East Malaysia for the first time, since other Tamil radio stations available in Malaysia only broadcast in Peninsular Malaysia.

Frequency

Television

Incidents
Noramfaizul Mohd Nor worked for Bernama TV as a TV camera operator when he was killed 2 September 2011 covering a humanitarian mission to Somalia. He was the first Malaysian journalist to be killed while on assignment abroad.

See also 
 List of Malaysian newspapers
 Sheikh Raffie

References

External links 

Federal ministries, departments and agencies of Malaysia
News agencies based in Malaysia
Mass media in Kuala Lumpur
Ministry of Communications and Multimedia (Malaysia)
1968 establishments in Malaysia
Government agencies established in 1968
24-hour television news channels in Malaysia
Television channels and stations established in 2007
Radio stations in Malaysia
Malay-language radio stations
Multilingual news services